Kangra is a city and a municipal council in Kangra district in the Indian state of Himachal Pradesh. It is also known as Nagarkot.

Meaning of Kangra
Kangri word in Ladakh/Lahaul means snow on top of mountain. Since snow capped mountains are visible from the city of Kangra, therefore it is named Kangra (town of snow laden peaks).

History

Historically known as Kiraj and Trigarta, the town of Kangra was founded by Katoch Kshatriya Rajputs of Chandervanshi Lineage. The Katoch Rajas had a stronghold here, with a fort and lavish temples.

Another ancient name of the city is Bhimagar and it was supposedly founded by Raja Bhim, younger brother of Kuru Emperor Yudhishthira of Indraprastha (now Delhi).

The temple of Devi Vajreshwari was one of the oldest and wealthiest in northern India. It was destroyed, together with the fort and the town, by 1905 Kangra earthquake on 4 April 1905, when 1339 people died in this place alone, and about 20,000 elsewhere. In 1855 the headquarters of the district were removed to the cantonment of Dharmsala, which was established in 1849.

Invasions of Nagarkot
It is said that Mahmud of Ghazni looted the Shri Bajreshwari Mata Mandir(Temple). He also looted a fort in the region in 1009, but whether the fort of Kangra was taken or not is not yet historically verified. There were hundreds of well-defended forts that lay between Ghazni and Nagarkot fort, and so it highly unlikely that his looting expedition ever reached Kangra. Also, this claim is negated by historians who have cited various sources to say that the fort was impregnable and remained unconquered until the conquest by Emperor Jehangir in 1622.

The Katoch-Sikh battles and alliances against the Kingdom of Nepal
The fort was recaptured by the Katoch Kings after Jehangir's death. Multiple battles ensued between the Sikh king Maharaja Ranjit Singh and the Katoch King Sansar Chand Katoch. But, while the war between the Sikhs and Katochs was taking place, the gates of Kangra fort were left open. The Gurkha army entered the opened gates of Nagarkot fort in 1806. This forced an alliance between the battling Sikhs and Katochs, and both the armies re-captured the fort after a battle in 1809. Kangra stayed with the Katoch Kings until 1828 when Maharaja Ranjit Singh annexed it after Sansar Chand's death. Then after the Nepalese Gorkha Captured the Kangra until the British Came theirs. The fort and city were then captured by the British in 1846 and remained occupied until India's independence. The princely state of Kangra was merged in India in 1948 by the then titled Raja of Kangra-Lambagraon namely Raja Druv Dev Chand Katoch.

Geography

Kangra has an average elevation of 733 metres (2404 ft). The district of Kangra extends from the Jalandhar Doab far into the southern ranges of the Himalaya. It is a town at the confluence of the Baner River and Majhi River, and Beas is an important river here.

Economy
Tea cultivation was introduced into Kangra valley about 1850. The Palampur fair, established by the government with a view to fostering commerce with central Asia, attracts a small concourse of Yarkandi merchants. The Lahulis carry on an enterprising trade with Ladakh and countries beyond the frontier, by means of the pack sheep and goats. Rice, tea, potatoes, spices, wool and honey are the chief exports.

Visitor attractions

The Kangra Fort is also a popular tourist attraction. It is one of the oldest forts in India as well as the oldest in Himachal Pradesh.

It is the home of Masroor Rock Cut Temple built by  the Pandavas, also known as Himalayan Pyramids and wonder of the world for being likely contender for the UNESCO World Heritage Site.

Many ancient temples such as the Jawalaji, Chamunda Devi temple, Chintapurni temple, Baba Baroh and Baijnath temple are located here.

Gopalpur Nature Park in Gopalpur village has tea gardens.

Mcleodganj near Dharamshala is the home-in-exile to the Dalai Lama. The Bhagsunag Temple is located there. The Himachal Pradesh Cricket Association Stadium in Dharamshala is also an attraction because of its location in front of the snow-capped mountains and is the highest altitude international cricket ground in the world.

Demographics
The 2001 India census states that Kangra had a population of 9,154. Males constitute 50% of the population and females 50%. Kangra has an average literacy rate of 83%, higher than the national average of 59.5%: male literacy is 85%, and female literacy is 81%. In Kangra, 10% of the population is under 6 years of age.

Demographics
 India census,
Number of Households - 1,924
Average Household Size(per Household) - 5.0
Population-Total - 10,185
Population-Urban - 10,185
Proportion of Urban Population (%) - 100
Population-Rural - 0
Sex Ratio - 997
Population (0-6 Years) - 902
Sex Ratio (0-6 Years) - 797
SC Population - 660
Sex Ratio (SC) - 1050
Proportion of SC (%) - 7.0
ST Population - 10
Sex Ratio (ST) -150 0
Proportion of ST (%) - 0
Literates - 7,567
Illiterates - 1,589
Literacy Rate (%) - 92.0

Transport
Kangra Airport (IATA airport code DHM) is 10 km to the city's north. It is served by Kangra Valley Railway line from Pathankot 94 km away. It is connected by road with other cities in Himachal Pradesh and India. It is 450 km from Delhi, 36 km from Palampur and 15 km from Dharamshala, 220 km from Chandigarh.

See also
Kangra Valley Railway
Kangra Fort
Kangra painting

References

Further reading
Chakrabarti D.K. (1984). The Antiquities of Kangra. Delhi: Munshiram Manoharlal Publishers Private Limited.

External links

Kangra photo gallery
Official Website of Kangra 
Plastic